The 2020–21 Davis Cup was the 109th edition of the Davis Cup, a tournament between national teams in men's tennis. It was sponsored by Rakuten. For this edition, the format of the cup was changed. The new format saw the creation of a Davis Cup World Group I and World Group II which was played on a worldwide basis and replaced the regional Group I and Group II. As a result, the Davis Cup Nations Ranking was no longer  used to determine which group a nation was played in. Previous the 2019, and the 2021 finals host Spain were the defending champions. Due to the COVID-19 pandemic, on 26 June 2020 the ITF announced that the 2020 finals would take place from 22 until 28 November 2021. In addition, 24 World Group I and World Group II ties were postponed to March and September 2021, and the 2020 regional Group III and Group IV events were also postponed to 2021. The 18 nations that qualified for the finals kept their standing for  the next year.

Davis Cup Finals

Date: 25 November–5 December 2021
Venue: Madrid Arena, Madrid, SpainOlympiahalle, Innsbruck, AustriaPala Alpitour, Turin, Italy
Surface: Hard court (indoor)

18 nations took part in the finals, formerly known as World Group. The qualification was as follows:
 4 semifinalists of the previous edition
 2 wild card teams (announced by ITF on 23 November 2019 as France and Serbia)
 12 winners of a qualifier round, in March 2020

H = Host Nation, TH = Title-Holder, WC = Wild Card

Seeds
The seedings were based on the Nations Ranking of 9 March.

#: Nations Ranking as of 9 March 2020.

Qualifying round

Date: 6–7 March 2020

Twenty-six eligible teams were:
 14 teams ranked 5th-18th in the Finals.
 12 winning teams from their Group I zone.

The remaining 24 nations competed in head-to-head matches, with the 12 winning teams to play at the Finals and the 12 losing teams to play at the World Group I in 2022.

The Davis Cup Qualifiers draw took place on 24 November 2019 at La Caja Mágica.

Seeded teams
 
 
 
 
 
 
 
 
 
 
 
 

Unseeded teams:

Group stage

T = Ties, M = Matches, S = Sets

Knockout stage

World Group I

Date: 5–6 March 2021 or 17–19 September 2021

Twenty-four teams participated in the World Group I, in series decided on a home and away basis. The seedings are based on the Nations Ranking of 9 March.

These twenty-four teams were:
 12 losing teams from Qualifying round:
 12 winning teams from World Group I Play-offs:

The eight highest-ranked winners (as at 20 September 2021) of the World Group I ties will automatically progress to the 2022 Qualifiers. The four lowest-ranked winners (Norway, Peru, Romania and Ukraine) took part in an additional knock-out tie in November 2021, with the two winners progressing to the 2022 Qualifiers and two losers contesting the 2022 World Group I Play-offs. The losing nations from the World Group I ties will compete in the World Group I Play-Offs in 2022.

#: Nations Ranking as of 9 March 2020.

Seeded teams
  (#4)
  (#16)
  (#19)
  (#20)
  (#21)
  (#22)
  (#25)
  (#26)
  (#27)
  (#28)
  (#29)
  (#30)

Unseeded teams
  (#31)
  (#32)
  (#33)
  (#34)
  (#35)
  (#36)
  (#37)
  (#38)
  (#40)
  (#41)
  (#42)
  (#45)

Qualifying round

Date: 6–9 March 2020

Twenty-four teams played for the twelve spots in the World Group I, in series decided on a home and away basis.

These twenty-four teams were:
 12 losing teams from their Group I zone.
 12 winning teams from their Group II zone.

The 12 winning teams from the play-offs played at the World Group I and the 12 losing teams played at the World Group II.

Seeded teams
 
 
 
 
 
 
 
 
 
 
 
 

Unseeded teams

Knock-out round

Date: 26–28 November 2021

Four teams played in this round, in series decided on a home and away basis.

These four teams were the four lowest-ranked winners of World Group I.

The two winning teams will play at the Qualifiers and the two losing teams will play at the World Group I Play-Offs in 2022.

#: Nations Ranking as of 20 September 2021.

Seeded teams
  (#33)
  (#35)

Unseeded teams
  (#40)
  (#43)

World Group II

Date: 5–6 March 2021 or 17–19 September 2021

Twenty-four teams participated in the World Group II, in series decided on a home and away basis. The seedings are based on the Nations Ranking of 9 March.

These twenty-four teams were:
 12 losing teams from World Group I Play-offs:
 12 winning teams from World Group II Play-offs:

The eight highest-ranked winners (as at 20 September 2021) of the World Group II ties will automatically progress to the 2022 World Group I Play-offs. The four lowest-ranked teams (Denmark, Morocco, Tunisia and Zimbabwe) took part in an additional knock-out tie in November, with the two winners progressing to the 2022 World Group I Play-offs and two losers contesting the 2022 World Group II Play-offs. The losing nations from the World Group II ties will compete in the World Group II Play-Offs in 2022.

#: Nations Ranking as of 9 March 2020.

Seeded teams
  (#39)
  (#43)
  (#44)
  (#46)
  (#47)
  (#48)
  (#49)
  (#50)
  (#51)
  (#52)
  (#53)
  (#54)

Unseeded teams
  (#55)
  (#56)
  (#57)
  (#58)
  (#59)
  (#60)
  (#61)
  (#62)
  (#63)
  (#64)
  (#65)
  (#66)

Qualifying round

Date: 6–7 March 2020

Twenty-four teams played for the twelve spots in the World Group II, in series decided on a home and away basis.

These twenty-four teams are:
 12 losing teams from their Group II zone:
 12 teams from their Group III zone:
 4 from Europe
 3 from Asia/Oceania,
 3 from Americas, and
 2 from Africa.

The 12 winning teams from the play-offs will play at the World Group II and the 12 losing teams will play at the Group III of the corresponding continental zone.

Seeded teams
 
 
 
 
 
 
 
 
 
 
 
 

Unseeded teams

Knock-out round

Date: 26–28 November 2021

Four teams played in this round, in series decided on a home and away basis.

These four teams were the four lowest-ranked winners of World Group II.

The two winning teams will play at the World Group I Play-offs and the two losing teams will play at the World Group II Play-Offs in 2022.

#: Nations Ranking as of 20 September 2021.

Seeded teams
  (#55)
  (#56)

Unseeded teams
  (#60)
  (#62)

Americas Zone

Group III

Dates: 30 June–3 July 2021 

Location: Centro de Alto Rendimineto Fred Maduro, Panama City, Panama (clay)

The first two nations qualify for the 2022 Davis Cup World Group II Play-offs

Teams

 
 
 
 
 
 

 
  (host)
 
 
 

Inactive Teams

Promotions
  and  qualify for the 2022 Davis Cup World Group II Play-offs

Asia/Oceania Zone

Group III

Dates: 15–18 September 2021 

Location: Jordan Tennis Federation, Amman, Jordan (hard)

The first three nations qualify for the 2022 Davis Cup World Group II Play-offs

Teams

 
  (host)
 
 
  Pacific Oceania

 
 
 
 
  (withdrew)

Promotions/Relegations
 ,  and Pacific Oceania qualify for the 2022 Davis Cup World Group II Play-offs

Group IV

Dates: 18–23 October 2021 

Location: Bahrain Tennis Federation Courts, Isa Town, Bahrain (hard)

The first three nations qualify for the 2022 Davis Cup Asia/Oceania Zone Group III

Teams

  (host)
 
 
 
 
 

 
 
 
 
 
 

Inactive Teams

Promotions

Europe Zone

Group III

Dates: 16–19 June 2021 

Location: Herodotou Tennis Academy, Larnaca, Cyprus (hard)

The first three nations qualify for the 2022 Davis Cup World Group II Play-offs

The last two nations (excluding )  are relegated to 2022 Davis Cup Europe Zone Group IV

Teams

  (host)
 
 
 

 
 
 
  (withdrew)

Promotions/Relegations
 ,  and  qualify for the 2022 Davis Cup World Group II Play-offs

Group IV

Dates: 22–26 June 2021 

Location: Tennis Club Jug, Skopje, North Macedonia (clay)

The first four nations qualify for the 2022 Davis Cup Europe Zone Group III

Teams

 
 
 
 
 

 
 
  (host)
 

Promotions

Africa Zone

Group III

Dates: 11–14 August 2021 

Location: Smash Academy, Cairo, Egypt (clay)

The first two nations qualify for the 2022 Davis Cup World Group II Play-offs

Teams

 
 
  (host)
 

 
  (withdrew)
 
 

Promotions/Relegations
  and  qualify for the 2022 Davis Cup World Group II Play-offs.

Group IV

Dates: 21–26 June 2021 

Location: Complexe Sportif La Concorde, Brazzaville, Congo (hard)

The first two nations qualify for the 2022 Davis Cup Africa Zone Group III

Teams

 
 
 
  (host)
 

 
 
 
 
 

Inactive Teams

Promotions

References

External links
Official website

 
Davis Cup
Davis Cup
Davis Cups by year
Davis Cup